Timothy Eaton Memorial Church is a church located at 230 St. Clair Avenue West in Forest Hill, Toronto, Ontario. Originally Methodist, since 1925, it has belonged to the United Church of Canada. The church is named in memory of Timothy Eaton, founder of the Eaton's department store chain, whose family donated the land the church sits on. It was completed in 1915 in the Gothic Revival style by Wickson & Gregg.

History

The Methodist Social Union of Toronto approached members of the Eaton family for their support in the creation of a church in the area. As a memorial to her husband, Timothy Eaton, Margaret Wilson Eaton and her son, John Craig Eaton, donated the land for the church and financed the construction of the original structures.

The Sunday School building was completed in 1911 and used for worship services until the sanctuary opened. The design work for the church building was done by the architectural firm of Wickson & Gregg. Construction was completed in 1915.

One of the church's best-known features is a 1915 stained glass reproduction of The Light of the World by English Pre-Raphaelite painter Holman Hunt; it was dedicated in memory of Timothy Eaton.  After the death of Sir John Craig Eaton, additional memorial windows were added. The majority of the stained glass in the church was created by the Robert McCausland Company of Toronto.

Famed Air Force ace Billy Bishop was married in the church, and his funeral was held there four decades later. The property has been listed in the City of Toronto Heritage Property Inventory since January 2008.

Broadcasts
This congregation has been known for its preaching ministry and music, and it has maintained radio and later internet broadcasts of its services.

See also
 List of United Church of Canada churches in Toronto
 Eaton family

References

External links

 Timothy Eaton Memorial Church website

United Church of Canada churches in Toronto
20th-century United Church of Canada church buildings
Churches completed in 1915
Gothic Revival architecture in Toronto
Gothic Revival church buildings in Canada
Eaton's